La Baume-Cornillane is a commune in the Drôme department in southeastern France.

Its inhabitants are called Balmois.

Geography

La Baume-Cornillane is located 15 km from Crest and 18 km from Valence. The territory of the municipality consists of three parts: the plain, the foothills of the Vercors Massif and the mountain.

Population

See also
Communes of the Drôme department

References

Communes of Drôme